Protein FAM60A is a protein that in humans is encoded by the FAM60A gene. The expression of FAM60A gene is higher in KRAS mutant non-small cell lung cancer.

References

Further reading